The San Diego Trough Fault Zone is a group of connected right-lateral strike-slip faults that run parallel to the coast of Southern California, United States, for . The fault zone takes up 25% of the slip within the Inner Continental Borderlands. Portions of the fault get within  of populated cities, however the faults never reach shore. The north of the fault zone begins where the San Pedro Basin Fault Zone and the Santa Catalina Fault Zone meet, and the southern section terminates where it reaches the Bahía Soledad Fault. Seismic risk along the fault is high, with potential earthquake scenarios reaching up to magnitude 7.9 in the worst case. An earthquake of this size would devastate coastal areas.

Tectonic background
California lies along the plate boundary between the North American Plate and the Pacific Plate. The San Andreas Fault system along with the Eastern California Shear Zone accommodate approximately 85% of the predominately strike-slip deformation. The rest of the plate motion is taken up by the California Continental Borderlands which itself is broken up into two parts: the Outer Continental Borderlands and the Inner Continental Borderlands (ICB). The ICB is associated with various offshore faults near the shore. The San Diego Trough Fault Zone lies within this area and accommodates around 25% of the strain release of the ICB through faulting.

Fault characteristics
Strands of the fault get to within  of San Diego and within  of Tijuana. The northern part of the fault zone is complex, as it is the meeting point between two fault zones: the San Pedro Basin Fault Zone and the Santa Catalina Fault Zone. They bound the Santa Catalina island platform with the Santa Catalina Fault Zone running to the west, and the San Pedro Basin Fault Zone to the east. South of this tectonic block, they join together, and this forms the San Diego Trough Fault Zone. The next segment of fault runs narrow and straight for a distance of  while roughly parallel to the coast. The fault zone continues south before merging with the Bahía Soledad fault off the coast of Baja California. Slip rate along the fault is estimated at ~/yr, which makes up 25% of Inner Continental Borderlands slip.

Seismic hazard and activity
Despite the San Diego Trough Fault Zone being a large and mature strike-slip fault system, it is poorly understood by researchers. However, it is thought that it is able to host large earthquakes capable of devastating southern California population centers, including the counties of Los Angeles, San Diego, and Orange. It has slipped in the Holocene period, which means it is recently active. Estimates predict a multi-segment rupture of the fault zone is capable of producing an earthquake magnitude 7.6–7.9. An earthquake this large in such close proximity to densely populated southern California would be devastating. In 1986, a  earthquake struck off the coast of Oceanside. As the event had a reverse faulting mechanism, it did not rupture the San Diego Trough Fault Zone itself, however it did rupture a  restraining step-over linking two fault zone segments. Aftershocks had varying focal mechanisms, with some as the result of reverse faulting within the step-over, and others as the result of strike-slip faulting.

See also
Rose Canyon Fault
Elsinore Fault
San Jacinto Fault
San Andreas Fault

References

Sources

 
 
 
 
 

Seismic faults of California
Geology of San Diego County, California
Strike-slip faults